The Florida Baptist Building (also known as the Rogers Building) is a historic building in Jacksonville, Florida. It is located at 218 West Church Street, and was designed by New York City architect Henry John Klutho. On January 12, 1984, it was added to the U.S. National Register of Historic Places.

References

External links
 Duval County listings at National Register of Historic Places
 Florida's Office of Cultural and Historical Programs
 Duval County listings
 Florida Baptist Building

Buildings and structures in Jacksonville, Florida
History of Jacksonville, Florida
National Register of Historic Places in Jacksonville, Florida
Henry John Klutho buildings